The Inner Ring Road, officially Mahatma Gandhi Inner Ring Road, is a ring road freeway of Guntur in the Indian state of Andhra Pradesh. The project includes two phases and was taken up by the then, VGTM Urban Development Authority (now APCRDA).

Route 

The route of the road starts at Autonagar area of the city at National Highway 5 and ends after encircling the city at Ankireddypalem on the same National Highway. The areas which it covers in the stretch are, Agathavarappadu, Gorantla, JKC college Road, Peda Palakaluru, Turakapalem, Nallapadu.

References 

Roads in Guntur
Ring roads in India